Somethin' Special may refer to:

 Somethin' Special (album), a 1962 album by Richard Holmes and Les McCann
 "Somethin' Special" (song), a 2008 song by Colbie Caillat

See also
 Something Special (disambiguation)